Goofy is a cartoon character created by The Walt Disney Company. 

Goofy may also refer to:

 Goofy (band), a South Korean dance music and hip hop trio
 Goofy (footedness), a stance in boardsports
 Goofy Ridge, Illinois, United States, a census-designated place

See also
 Goof (disambiguation)
 Goofball (disambiguation)